John Chiara (born 1971, in San Francisco, California) is an American contemporary artist and photographer.

Education
Chiara holds a B.F.A. from the University of Utah (1995) and a M.F.A. in photography from the California College of the Arts (2004) where he studied with Larry Sultan.

Career
Chiara builds custom large-format cameras, and exposes his images directly onto hand-cut photographic paper. He built his first camera in 1997.

Exhibitions

Solo
2017: John Chiara Lands End: California at Larkin, Haines Gallery, San Francisco, CA.
2017: John Chiara: New Cityscapes, Crown Point Press, San Francisco, CA
2018: John Chiara California/Mississippi, Galerie Miranda, Paris, France.
2018: Pike Slip to Sugar Hill, Yossi Milo Gallery, New York, NY.

Group
2012: Here, Pier 24 Photography, San Francisco, CA.
2013: Twsited Sisters: Reimaging Urban Portraiture, Museum Bärengasse, Zurich, CH.
2013: Crown Point Press at 50, de Young Museum, Fine Arts Museums of San Francisco, San Francisco, CA.
2014: A Sense of Place, Pier 24 Photography, San Francisco, CA.
2015: Light, Paper, Process, Reinventing Photography, Curated by Virginia Heckert, J. Paul Getty Museum, Los Angeles, CA.
2016: Boundless: A California Invitational, Museum of Photographic Arts, San Diego, CA.
2016: A Matter of Memory, George Eastman Museum, Rochester, NY.
2018: New Southern Photography, Ogden Museum of Southern Art, New Orleans, LA.
2018: Triennale de l’art imprimé contemporain, Musée des beaux-arts, Le Locle, CH.
2018: A Brilliant Spectrum: Recent Gifts of Color Photography, Santa Barbara Museum of Art, Santa Barbara, CA.
2018: New Territory Landscape Photography Today, Denver Art Museum, Denver, CO.

Publications

Publications by Chiara
 John Chiara: California. New York: Aperture; San Francisco, Pier 24 Photography, 2017.

Publications with contributions by Chiara
Here., San Francisco: Pier 24 Photography, 2011. . 
A Sense of Place, San Francisco: Pier 24 Photography, 2015. . Exhibition catalog.
Light, Paper, Process: Reinventing Photography, Los Angeles, J. Paul Getty Museum, 2015.

Collections
Chiara's work is held in the following public collections:
J. Paul Getty Museum, Los Angeles, CA.
Los Angeles County Museum of Art, CA.
National Gallery of Art, Washington, D.C.
Pier 24 Photography, San Francisco, CA.
San Francisco Museum of Modern Art, San Francisco, CA.

References

1971 births
California College of the Arts alumni
Living people
Fine art photographers
20th-century American photographers
21st-century American photographers
Landscape photographers
Photographers from San Francisco